Wine in the Czech Republic is produced mainly in southern Moravia, although a few vineyards are located in Bohemia. However, Moravia accounts for around 96% of the country's vineyards, which is why Czech wine is more often referred to as Moravian wine.  Production centers on local grape varieties, but there has been an increase in the production of established international strains such as Cabernet Sauvignon.

History
In the 2nd Century CE, the Roman 10th Legion based at Vindobona built an extensive outpost near the Amber Road and the Pálava Hills in Mikulovská, near the present-day village of Pasohlávky. Around the year 278, the Roman Emperor Marcus Aurelius Probus annulled the edict of Emperor Domitian that had prohibited the planting of grapes in colonies north of the Alps, and encouraged the planting of new vines in the northern Roman colonies. Modern-day archaeological excavations of the ancient Roman outpost near Pasohlávky have yielded many artifacts, including a vine pruning knife. Wine historians theorize that, during the Roman occupation, the Grüner Veltliner and Welschriesling grape varieties may have been introduced to the region.  Viticulture was practiced during the Great Moravian Empire (833–906), as evidenced by numerous pruning knives and grape seeds unearthed during archaeological excavations of Slavic settlements.

Around 875, according to legend, the Great Moravian Prince Svatopluk sent the Bohemian Prince Bořivoj a barrel of wine to celebrate the birth of his son Spytihněv. Bořivoj's wife Ludmila sacrificed some of the wine to Krosyně (goddess of the harvest) while making a plea for abundant rain. Her wish came true, the crop was saved and Bořivoj and Ludmila planted the first Bohemian vineyards around Mělník. Their grandson Saint Wenceslas later learned how to cultivate vines in these vineyards and make wine. He is honored by Czech winemakers as "Supremus Magister Vinearum" (Supreme Burgomaster of the Vineyards) and every year at the end of September a wine festival is held in Mělník on Feast of St. Wenceslas.

During the 13th century, monasteries helped to establish large vineyard areas which were planted with grape varieties imported from France and Germany. The vine training and pruning methods of these countries were also adopted. The vineyard groupings made it easier to maintain the vineyards, protect against thieves, and to collect tithe payments and taxes during the harvest.

In 1249, Ottokar II of Bohemia granted the land of Mikulov (then called Nikolsburg) and the surrounding area to the Austrian noble Henry I of Liechtenstein. Afterward, more vineyards were planted in the Pálava Hills. In 1309, a new set of viticultural and winemaking regulations was established for many southern Moravian villages, based on the application of Bergrecht laws and vineyard rules of Falkenstein, Lower Austria in the district of Mikulov. For those villages under the jurisdiction of the Falkenstein Bergrecht, Falkenstein served as the Supreme Appeals Court in vineyard disputes. By 1368, Mikulov was one of the largest wine centres in Moravia. In 1414, a large number of the vineyards around Mikulov and Valtice were documented in the Liechtenstein Duties Register, later to become the oldest preserved register of the Liechtenstein vineyards.

The Thirty Years' War (1618–1648) destroyed a significant portion of the vineyards in Moravia, and over the next hundred years they were gradually replanted. In 1763, Austrian vintners asked Maria Theresa to limit new vineyard plantings in Moravia to reduce the competition from Moravian wines. In 1783, the local Bergrecht laws and the activities of the wine regulation court in Moravia were abolished by Joseph II, Holy Roman Emperor and replaced with a new set of vineyard regulations for Moravia.

Wine academies, dedicated to training capable enologists in the art and science of winemaking, were founded in Bzenec (1855), Znojmo (1868), Valtice (1873), Mělník (1882), Lednice (1895), Mikulov (1903) and Klobouky (1921).

The vine pest Phylloxera arrived in Šatov in 1890, Mikulov and Dolní Dunajovice in 1900, struck Perná in 1901, and hit Horní Věstonice and Bavory in 1902, devastating the vineyards throughout Moravia. Using Phylloxera-resistant rootstock, the vineyards were replanted with quality vines of single varietals.

The establishment of modern wine laws in the Czech Republic began in 1995 with the enactment of Wine Act No. 115/1995 on viticulture and winemaking practices into the Collection of Laws (Sb). The wine section of the European Union regulations was translated into Czech and subsequently incorporated into the Wine Act. The original draft of the Amendment to the Wine Act also contained provisions for establishing the Czech Wine Fund through Act No. 50/2002 Sb. After the Czech Republic joined the European Union in 2004, the Wine Act No. 321/2004 Sb on viticulture and winemaking practices was adopted, bringing Czech wine legislation into conformity with EU standards.

Regions

Czech wine law (2004) defines two wine-growing regions (Czech: Vinařská oblast). These are Moravia (Vinařská oblast Morava) and Bohemia (Vinařská oblast Čechy).

Moravia
Wine production in the Czech Republic centers on southern Moravia, particularly around the river Dyje. Four wine growing sub-regions (Czech: Vinařská podoblast) are located here, each named after a major town or region. These sub-regions are:

Wine production intertwined with the local culture made Moravia a key wine tourism destination in Czech Republic. Established in 1999, Moravian Wine Trail is a unique project designed to protect cultural heritage and encourage further development of wine tourism in the region. The trail covers almost 300 towns and villages in the Moravian region inter-connected by a network of cycling routes.

The Czech National Wine Centre and Wine Salon of the Czech Republic in Valtice Castle are located in Moravian wine country.

Bohemia 
Bohemia is home to a relatively tiny collection of vineyards that are among the most northerly in Europe. They are situated around 50° north latitude, the same as Wiesbaden in the Rheingau. Two defined wine-growing subregions are located in Bohemia:

Small vineyards can be found in Prague, but they do not produce a significant amount of wine. The top five grape varieties grown in Bohemia are Müller-Thurgau (26% of vineyards), Riesling (16% of vineyards), St. Laurent (14% of vineyards), Blauer Portugieser (10% of vineyards), and Pinot noir (8% of vineyards).

Largest wine municipalities
As of 2018, the following wine municipalities were the largest:

Grape varieties

The most commonly grown grape varieties in the Czech Republic, including the approximate percentage of wine produced for each variety, are listed below:

Wine festivals

The wine-producing areas of the Czech Republic are well known for their wine festivals (Czech: vinobraní) which take place around harvest time in September. The biggest of these festivals in Znojmo, Mikulov, Brno and Mělník will feature samples of hundreds of local wines as well as local music, dancing and cuisine. These wine-festivals take place in big towns apart from the wine-producing areas as well (such as Prague).

Classification

Czech wine law classifies wine according to the origin of the grapes and the ripeness of the grapes determined by measuring the must weight in the grape juice at the time of harvest. Sugar content is expressed in units of °NM on the Czecho-Slovak Normalised Must-Weight Scale (Czech: Normalizovaný moštoměr), which indicates how many kilograms of sugar are contained in one hundred litres of grape juice. One degree on the NM scale is equivalent to one kilogram of natural sugar in 100 litres of grape must. Czech wine is typically labeled with its variety, detailed description of its origin, and wine quality attributes. In general, wine produced from grapes with a higher must-weight level and from a single vineyard is considered higher quality.

Origin specification
A Czech wine label will typically specify the wine's origin with one or more of the following terms:

 Vinařská oblast – (Region) e.g. Morava (Moravia)
 Vinařská podoblast – (Subregion) e.g. Velkopavlovická (Velké Pavlovice)
 Vinařská obec – (Municipality)
 Trať – (Vineyard)

Composition and Quality Attributes
A Czech wine label must contain one of the following terms that designates its classification:

1. Jakostní víno s přívlastkem (Quality Wine with Special Attributes)
 Wine must originate from a single wine sub-region and the grape varieties, their origin, must-weight levels, and weight must be verified by the Czech State Agricultural & Food Inspectorate (SZPI). Chaptalisation is not permitted.

2. Jakostní víno (Quality wine)
 Wine produced from grapes grown in the Czech Republic within a single wine region. Yields must not exceed 12 tons/hectare and must-weight levels must be no less than 15 °NM.
 Jakostní víno odrůdové (Quality Varietal Wine)
 Wine made from at most three grape varieties
 Jakostní víno známkové (Quality Brand Wine)
 Wine that is a blend (cuveé) of at least two grape varieties

3. Moravské zemské víno or České zemské víno (Country wine)
 Wine produced from grapes originating from the Czech Republic, must-weight levels must be no less than 14 °NM.

4. Stolní víno (Table wine)
 Wine produced from grapes originating from any country in the EU. This is the lowest wine category.

Appelation (VOC) 
In the late 2000s, in parallel with the origin and the composition and quality attributes, system the appelleation-based system was introduced - vína originální cetrifikace (VOC, wines of original certification). Following VOCs are certified as of 2019:

Notes

References

External links

 Official Czech Wine Industry Website
 Moravian Wine Information
 Czech Wine Tourism
 Summary of Czech wine industry and further links